Hilary Skarżyński (18 June 1925 – 30 September 1987) was a Polish ice hockey player. He played for Siła Giszowiec, HKS Siemianowiczanka, Stal Katowice, and Górnik 1920 Katowice during his career. He also played for the Polish national team at the 1948, 1952, and 1956 Winter Olympics, and the 1955 and  1957 World Championship. He died in a car accident in Miami Beach, Florida in 1987.

References

External links
 

1925 births
1987 deaths
Baildon Katowice players
GKS Katowice (ice hockey) players
Ice hockey players at the 1948 Winter Olympics
Ice hockey players at the 1952 Winter Olympics
Ice hockey players at the 1956 Winter Olympics
Olympic ice hockey players of Poland
Polish ice hockey forwards
Road incident deaths in Florida
Sportspeople from Katowice